The Florida ThunderCats were an indoor soccer club based in Fort Lauderdale, Florida that competed in the National Professional Soccer League. The team folded after one season.

Year-by-year

References

Soccer clubs in Miami
Soccer clubs in Florida
National Professional Soccer League (1984–2001) teams
Defunct indoor soccer clubs in the United States
Sports in Fort Lauderdale, Florida
1999 disestablishments in Florida
1998 establishments in Florida
Association football clubs established in 1998
Association football clubs disestablished in 1999
Sunrise, Florida